Thanh Hóa is the capital of Thanh Hóa Province. The city is situated in the east of the province on the Ma River (Sông Mã), about 150 kilometers (93 miles) south of Hanoi and 1560 kilometers (969 miles) north of Ho Chi Minh City. Thanh Hoa became one of the most populous cities in North Central Coast after expanding in 2012, with a population of approximately 400,000. Thanh Hoa township was upgraded to Thanh Hoa City in 1994 and has been the historical center of politics, economy, culture, education and entertainment of Thanh Hóa Province.

Overview

Thanh Hoa is a new developing city although its central position was established centuries before. Nowadays, provincial administrators are trying to build and gentrify the city so that its important role for the whole province and even North Central Coast is emphasised.

History
The Citadel of the Hồ Dynasty was the capital of the Trần dynasty from 1398 to 1400 and the Hồ dynasty from 1400 to 1407.

The Thanh Hóa town and region were an area of popular support for Lê Lợi and the Lê dynasty in the 1580s, leading to the reestablishment of the southern court near the town following the withdrawal of Ming dynasty armies. After 1945 the city was a stronghold of the Viet Minh. In January 1946 the Viet Minh transported all local cells of the VNQDD to the city. During the Vietnam War, US strategic bombing destroyed much of the buildings and infrastructure; the whole city has been totally rebuilt since then.

Geography

Topography

Thanh Hoa city is located in centre of Thanh Hoa's plain with many scattered rocky mountains surround. There are two main mountains along the city: Hàm Rồng and Mật Sơn. Hàm Rồng mountain begins from Thiệu Dương commune, which is about 8 km from city centre, along the right bank of the Ma River to Hàm Rồng Thanh Hóa Bridge pier. Ham Rong mountain has 99 peaks and had become an entrench for air defensive in Operation Rolling Thunder. 
Ma River is the longest river flow through the city, meandering around Ham Rong mountain before flowing to South East Asian sea. In addition, there are 5 canals were dug in order to support for watering, drought and flooding.

Climate

Temperature
Possessing a marginal humid subtropical climate (Köppen Cwa), bordering on a tropical savanna climate (Aw), Thanh Hóa city has four seasons with two distinctive hot and cold atmospheres in a year. 
 The hot season: Beginning in late spring to mid-autumn (April to mid-November), weather is extreme heat with sunny and sometime Foehn wind. In this period, flood and drought occur frequently.
 The cool season: Beginning in November to the end of March the following year. The atmosphere is mostly cloudy and dried with cool monsoon from Northeast direction. The lowest temperature may down to 

Monsoon
Thanh Hóa city is located in coast region so it is affected by three seasonal winds, which are mainly referred to distinctive wind directions.
 Northeast direction wind: Blowing from Siberia, and usually comes in January. The winds causes the coolest period of winter. 
 Foehn wind: Blowing from Bengal passing on Laos to North Central Coast Vietnam. Thus, it's called "Gió Lào" in Vietnamese referred to the wind from Laos direction. The wind occurs in summer, normally July or August and causes the hottest atmosphere in a year.
 Southeast direction wind (Gió Nồm): Blowing from sea and occurring in Summer. At the heat of hot season, the winds brings fresh atmosphere to land and cool down temperature

Rainfall

Administrative Subdivision

By the time 2012, Thanh Hoa city had 12 inner wards and 6 outer communes. After expansion in February 2012, the city merged some subdivisions from other nearby districts and that extended total of urban subdivisions up to 37. Thanh Hoa city currently has 20 inner wards and 17 outer communes.

Note: Area: km2; Density: People/km2 (Statistics in 2009)

After expansion, Thanh Hoa city's population had rise up from 207,698 to 406,550 people (2014). According to urban development plan in 2012, the estimated population will be approximate 1 million in 2030 with 800,000 urban people.

Thanh Hoa Citadel

A star shaped fortress was built in 1804 during the reign of Emperor Gia Long to improve  defense of the city. It was French-influenced and defended the residents with a moat. It is now a residential area covering Ðiện Biên and Tân Sơn wards.

Economy

According to statistics from 2013, the GDP sector composition of the city's economy was the following:
 Agricultural sector: 7.6%
 Industrial sector: 46%
 Service sector: 46.4%
The annual economic growth rate was 15% (2013). Total of capital development fund estimated 12,665 thousand billion VND (~650 million USD), export volume estimated 504 million USD. State budgets revenue is 1,436 thousand billion VND(~70 million USD). GDP per capital is 3,930 USD.

Currently, there are three industrial regions locally:
 Le Mon industrial region: Is situated in the east and 5 km from city centre. The industrial hub was established in 2005 with planned scale 87 hectare. Main industries concentrate on high-tech applications, manufacturing and processing raw materials within province, agricultural, forestry and fishery, mechanical assembly, electronic and telecommunication devices,... Some FDI organizations invested and operate are Sunjade company (Taiwan), Sakura company, Yotsuba Dress company (Japan), Vinamilk,...
 Dinh Huong industrial region: Is located 2 km from north city centre.

Transportation 

As central position of province, Thanh Hoa city is the heart of transport network, where every essential transportation modes are aggregated such as North–South Railway (Vietnam), National Route 1A (Vietnam), National Route 47, buses system and many other provincial routes.

Le Mon port is situated beside Ma River and 4 km from city centre east. This river port supports and provides transportation for Le Mon industrial region.

In February 2013, Tho Xuan Airport, which is located 45 km to the east from city, was implemented and upgrade to turn into a mixed civilian/military airport. This airport became the place provide air transport services for Thanh Hoa city.

References 

 
Populated places in Thanh Hóa province
Districts of Thanh Hóa province
Provincial capitals in Vietnam
Cities in Vietnam